The St Bathans fauna is found in the lower Bannockburn Formation of the Manuherikia Group of Central Otago, in the South Island of New Zealand. It comprises a suite of fossilised prehistoric animals from the late Early Miocene (Altonian) period, with an age range of 19–16 million years ago.

The layer in which the fossils are found derives from littoral zone sediments deposited in a shallow, freshwater lake, with an area of 5600 km2 from present day Central Otago to Bannockburn and the Nevis Valley in the west; to Naseby in the east; and from the Waitaki Valley in the north to Ranfurly in the south. The lake was bordered by an extensive floodplain containing herbaceous and grassy wetland habitats with peat-forming swamp–woodland. At that time the climate was warm with a distinctly subtropical Australian climate and the surrounding vegetation was characterised by casuarinas, eucalypts and palms as well as podocarps, araucarias and southern beeches.

The fossiliferous layer has been exposed at places along the Manuherikia River and at other sites in the vicinity of the historic gold mining town of St Bathans. The fauna consists of a variety of vertebrates, including fish, a crocodilian, a rhynchocephalian (a relative of tuatara), geckos, skinks, and several kinds of birds, especially waterbirds. Of tree-dwelling birds, parrots outnumber pigeons thirty to one. Proapteryx, a basal form of kiwi, is known from there. The Miocene ecosystem was recovering from the ‘Oligocene drowning’ a few million years earlier, when up to 80% of the current land area of New Zealand was submerged. The wildlife that lived in, on, and around the palaeolake Manuherikia was uniquely New Zealand, which strongly suggesting that some emergent land remained during this near drowning event. Marked global cooling and drying during the Miocene, Pliocene and the Pleistocene Ice Ages resulted in the extinction of the ‘subtropical’ elements of the St Bathans’ fauna. Those that survived adapted to the dynamic geological and climatic changes, and would form part of the enigmatic fauna that characterised New Zealand when humans arrived in the late 13th century.

History of excavation 

Research on the St Bathans fauna is led by Trevor Worthy, a New Zealander based in Flinders University, Adelaide. Other key scientists involved include Jenny Worthy from Flinders University, Paul Scofield and Vanesa De Pietri from Canterbury Museum, and Alan Tennyson from the Museum of New Zealand Te Papa Tongarewa. In 2016 Vanesa De Pietri was awarded a Royal Society of New Zealand Marsden Fast Start grant to study the shorebird fossils. This long-running (since 2000) collaborative research programme also includes scientists from the University of New South Wales in Sydney and from the University of Queensland in Brisbane.

Mammals
Surprisingly, given modern New Zealand's dearth of land mammals, there is a basal theriiform mammal, the St Bathans mammal. Several species of mystacine bats are also known, as well as a vesper bat and several incertae sedis species. This bat fauna included a giant burrowing bat three times the size of today’s relatives, and more closely related to South American bats. This suggests that small land mammals were a common component of New Zealand's fauna in the Miocene, with even bats being significantly more diverse than today.

Birds

Palaeognaths

New Zealand's two modern palaeognath clades, the kiwi and moa, have early representatives in the St Bathans fauna. The former is represented by the diminutive, possibly volant Proapteryx. The last is represented by several bones and egg shells of currently unnamed species, but already identifiable as true moa, being large sized and flightless. The fact that moa are already recognisably modern in anatomy, and possibly ecology, while kiwis are fairly unspecialised and probably still flighted, confirms the previous suspicions that neither clade is closely related and that they arrived in New Zealand independently: moa arrived and became flightless earlier in the Cenozoic, while kiwi were then recent arrivals.

Charadriiformes
Charadriiformes, including gulls, terns, noddies, snipes, dotterels, plovers, jacanas, oystercatchers, sheathbills and the plains-wanderer, are a large group of birds that are mostly found in marine or semi-marine environments. There are about 350 species, and they are mostly small to medium-sized. Two of these are known from the St Bathans Fauna, the New Zealand lake-wanderer (Hakawai melvillei), a relative of the plains-wanderer, and Sansom's plover (Neilus sansomae), a plover-like bird of uncertain affinities but possibly related to sheathbills and the Magellanic plover.

Parrots
Two parrot genera are represented. Heracles is represented by its sole species, Heracles inexpectatus, the largest known parrot, weighing 7 kilograms and standing 1 meter tall. Nelepsittacus is represented by at least four species. These vary drastically in size, suggesting that they occupied a wide variety of ecological niches, having diversified in the relative absence of other parrots.

Pigeons
Two pigeon species have been described. Rupephaps is a large fruit pigeon, possibly related to the modern Hemiphaga species. The Zealandian dove is similar to the Nicobar pigeon.

Passeriformes
A New Zealand wren, Kuiornis indicator, is known from these deposits, possibly similar to the modern rifleman. Two or three other species remain undescribed.

Palaelodids 
Palaelodids are ancient relatives of flamingos. The new species from St Bathans (Palaelodus aotearoa) is smaller than, and morphologically distinct from, the Late Oligocene-Early Miocene Palaelodus wilsoni from Australia.

Petrels 
Petrels are seabirds in the order Procellariformes. This group includes albatrosses. Petrels today make up most of all species of seabird, and the order is the only order of birds to be entirely marine. One species of petrel is known from the St Bathans Fauna-a diving petrel in the same genus as modern diving petrels, the Miocene diving petrel (Pelecanoides miokuaka).

Herons
At least two herons are known: Pikaihao bartlei and Matuku otagoense. The former is a bittern, while the latter is a much larger species that appears to be basal within Ardeidae (the herons).

Eagles and hawks 
One eagle similar in size to a wedge-tailed eagle, and another taxon similar in size to a small hawk, are present in the St Bathans fauna, but await formal description.

Rails and allies 
The St Bathans adzebill (Aptornis proasciarostratus) was only slightly smaller than its more recent descendants. There were two flightless rails: the common Priscaweka parvales and uncommon Litorallus livezeyi. Priscaweka parvales was no bigger than a sparrow.

Waterfowl
Anseriforms dominate the St Bathans fauna. There are at least nine species recognised from St Bathans, making it the richest waterfowl fauna in the world. All the waterfowl species are unique to New Zealand. These include: bones attributable to Cape Barren Goose (Cereopsis spp.) thought to represent the ancestors of extinct Pleistocene-Holocene Cnemiornis goose, and those of a second possible goose species. In both instances, there is not enough material currently to erect species. Stiff-tailed ducks dominate the fauna with Manuherikia lacustrina, M. minuta, M. douglasi, Dunstanneta johnstoneorum and a further undescribed species of Manuherikia. Only one species of shelduck Miotadorna sanctibathansi, though common, was present in the St Bathans fauna. The dabbling duck Matanas enrightii remains poorly known as only a few fossils of this species have been found.

Herpetofauna (reptiles and amphibians)

The St Bathans fauna is rich in reptile and amphibian remains. Several groups present in modern New Zealand are represented, such as leiopelmatid frogs, a sphenodontian similar to the modern tuatara, geckos, and skinks. However, there are also several species not seen in modern-day New Zealand, such as a mekosuchine crocodile up to 3 metres in length and pleurodire and meiolaniid turtles. This suggests that New Zealand's herpetofauna was much richer in this epoch, probably because its climate was considerably warmer than today.

Fish 
The vast majority of the bones excavated from St Bathans are those of freshwater fish such as the ancient relatives of today's bullies, galaxiids, and the extinct New Zealand grayling.

Aquatic invertebrates 
As well as fishes, shellfish, including freshwater mussels, and freshwater crayfish dominated the aquatic life in the palaeolake Manuherikia. A new species of St Bathans freshwater limpet, Latia manuherikia, was described by malacologist Bruce Marshall in 2011. This was both the first known fossil Latia and the first record of this genus from the South Island.

Absent taxa from St Bathans 
Notable examples include marsupials, snakes, agamid and varanid lizards, lungfish, eels, cockatoos, and all but one lineage (bellbirds and tui) of the 80 species of Australian honeyeaters.

References

Fossils of New Zealand
Geography of Otago
Lagerstätten
Miocene paleontological sites
Paleontological sites of New Zealand
Prehistoric fauna by locality